The posterior cerebral artery (PCA) is one of a pair of cerebral arteries that supply oxygenated blood to the occipital lobe, part of the back of the human brain. The two arteries originate from the distal end of the basilar artery, where it bifurcates into the left and right posterior cerebral arteries. These anastomose with the middle cerebral arteries and internal carotid arteries via the posterior communicating arteries.

Structure
The posterior cerebral artery is subdivided into 4 segments:

P1: pre-communicating segment 
 Originated at the termination of the basilar artery 
 May give rise to the artery of Percheron if present 

P2: post-communicating segment 
 From the PCOM around the midbrain 
 Terminates as it enters the quadrigeminal ganglion 
 Gives rise to the choroidal branches (medial and lateral posterior choroidal arteries) 

P3: quadrigeminal segment 
 Courses posteromedially through the quadrigeminal cistern 
 Terminates as it enters the sulk of the occipital lobe 

P4: cortical segment 
 Within the sulci of the occipital lobe 

The branches of the posterior cerebral artery are divided into two sets, ganglionic and cortical.

Central branches

The following are central branches of the PCA, also known as perforating branches:
Thalamoperforating and thalamogeniculate or postero-medial ganglionic branches: a group of small arteries which arise at the commencement of the posterior cerebral artery: these, with similar branches from the posterior communicating, pierce the posterior perforated substance, and supply the medial surfaces of the thalami and the walls of the third ventricle. 
 Peduncular perforating or postero-lateral ganglionic branches: small arteries which arise from the posterior cerebral artery after it has turned around the cerebral peduncle; they supply a considerable portion of the thalamus.

Posterior (choroidal) branches

The posterior choroidal branches of the posterior cerebral artery are sometimes referred to as a single posterior choroidal artery.
Medial posterior choroidal branches: run forward beneath the splenium of the corpus callosum, and supply the tela choroidea of the third ventricle and the choroid plexus.
Lateral posterior choroidal branches: small branches to the cerebral peduncle, fornix, thalamus, caudate nucleus, and choroid plexus of the lateral ventricle.

Cortical branches
The cortical branches are: 
Anterior temporal, distributed to the uncus and the anterior part of the fusiform gyrus 
Posterior temporal, to the fusiform and the inferior temporal gyri 
Lateral occipital, which branches into the anterior, middle and posterior inferior temporal arteries
Medial occipital, which branches into the:
Calcarine sulcus, to the cuneus and lingual gyrus and the back part of the convex surface of the occipital lobe 
Parieto-occipital sulcus, to the cuneus and the precuneus
Splenial, or the posterior pericallosal branch, sometimes anastomoses with the anterior cerebral artery (ACA), and may not be present if the ACA wraps around the corpus callosum

Development
The prenatal development of the posterior cerebral arteries in the fetus comes relatively late and arises from the fusion of several embryonic vessels near the caudal ends of the posterior communicating arteries supplying the mesencephalon and diencephalon. The PCA begins as such, as a continuation of the PCommA in the fetus with only 10–30% of fetuses having a prominent basilar origin.

The fetal carotid origin of the PCA usually regresses as the vertebral and basilar arteries develop with the PCommA reducing is size. In most adults, the PCA sources from the anterior portion of the basilar artery. Only about 19% of adults retain PCommA dominance of the PCA with 72% having dominant basilar origin, and the rest having either equal prominence between PCommA and basilar artery, or a single exclusive source.

Clinical significance

Stroke

Contralateral loss of pain and temperature sensations.
Visual field defects (contralateral hemianopsia with macular sparing).
Prosopagnosia with bilateral obstruction of the lingual and fusiform gyri.
Superior Alternating Syndrome (Weber's syndrome)
Ipsilateral deficits of oculomotor nerve,
Contralateral deficits of facial nerve (only lower face, upper face receives bilateral input), vagus nerve and hypoglossal nerve
Horner's Syndrome

Signs and symptoms: Structures involved

Peripheral territory (Cortical branches)
 Homonymous hemianopsia (often upper quadrantic): Calcarine cortex or optic radiation nearby. 
 Bilateral homonymous hemianopsia, cortical blindness, awareness or denial of blindness; tactile naming, achromatopia (color blindness), failure to see to-and-fro movements, inability to perceive objects not centrally located, apraxia of ocular movements, inability to count or enumerate objects, tendency to run into things that the patient sees and tries to avoid: Bilateral occipital lobe with possibly the parietal lobe involved. 
 Verbal dyslexia without agraphia, color anomia: Dominant calcarine lesion and posterior part of corpus callosum. 
 Memory defect: Hippocampal lesion bilaterally or on the dominant side only. 
 Topographic disorientation and prosopagnosia: Usually with lesions of nondominant, calcarine, and lingual gyrus. 
 Simultanagnosia, hemivisual neglect: Dominant visual cortex, contralateral hemisphere. 
 Unformed visual hallucinations, peduncular hallucinosis, metamorphopsia, teleopsia, illusory visual spread, palinopsia, distortion of outlines, central photophobia: Calcarine cortex. 
 Complex hallucinations: Usually nondominant hemisphere.

Central territory (Ganglionic branches)
 Thalamic syndrome: sensory loss (all modalities), spontaneous pain and dysesthesias, choreoathetosis, intention tremor, spasms of hand, mild hemiparesis, contralateral hemianaethesia: Posteroventral nucleus of thalamus; involvement of the adjacent subthalamus body or its afferent tracts. 
 Thalamoperforate syndrome: crossed cerebellar ataxia with ipsilateral third nerve palsy (Claude's syndrome): Dentatothalamic tract and issuing third nerve. 
 Weber's syndrome: third nerve palsy and contralateral hemiplegia: Third nerve and cerebral peduncle. 
 Contralateral hemiplegia: Cerebral peduncle. 
 Paralysis or paresis of vertical eye movement, skew deviation, sluggish pupillary responses to light, slight miosis and ptosis (retraction nystagmus and "tucking" of the eyelids may be associated): Supranuclear fibers to third nerve, interstitial nucleus of Cajal, nucleus of Darkschewitsch, and posterior commissure. 
 Contralateral rhythmic, ataxic action tremor; rhythmic postural or "holding" tremor (rubral tremor): Dentatothalamic tract.

Additional images

See also

Circle of Willis
Anterior cerebral artery

References

External links

  – Posterior cerebral artery stroke
 
 
 
 Overview
 Angiography at State University of New York Upstate Medical University
 Diagram
 Blood supply

Arteries of the head and neck